Delaware Water Gap National Recreation Area is a  national recreation area administered by the National Park Service in northwest New Jersey and northeast Pennsylvania. It is centered around a  stretch of the Delaware River designated the Middle Delaware National Scenic River. At the area's southern end lays the Delaware Water Gap, a dramatic mountain pass where the river cuts between Blue Mountain and Kittatinny Mountain 

More than 4 million people visit the recreation area annually, many from the nearby New York metropolitan area. Canoeing, kayaking, and rafting trips down the river are popular in the summer. Other activities include hiking, rock climbing, swimming, fishing, hunting, camping, cycling, cross-country skiing, and horseback riding. Worthington State Forest and a section of the long-distance Appalachian Trail are located within the area, alongside numerous waterfalls and historic sites.

The region, known historically as the Minisink, was inhabited by the Munsee at the time of Dutch and French Huguenot colonization in the late 17th century. The national recreation area was established in 1965 ahead of a dam project which would have flooded a large region north of the Water Gap. Over 15,000 people were displaced as the U.S. Army Corps of Engineers acquired land for the reservoir. The controversial project was ultimately canceled in 1978 and the land transferred to the recreation area.

There are recent efforts to re-designate the area as a national park, the first in New Jersey or Pennsylvania.

Description

The recreation area includes parts of Sussex and Warren counties in New Jersey, and Monroe, Northampton, and Pike counties in Pennsylvania. The Appalachian Trail runs along much of the eastern boundary of the park and is maintained and updated by the New York–New Jersey Trail Conference.

The park offers historical and cultural sites including the Minisink Archaeological Site, Millbrook Village, and the arts center in Peters Valley and rural scenery approximately an hour's drive from New York City. The park has significant Native American archaeological sites. In addition, a number of structures remain from early Dutch settlement during the colonial period. Outdoor recreational activities include canoeing, hiking, camping, swimming, cycling, cross-country skiing, horseback riding, and picnicking. Fishing and hunting are permitted in season with valid state licenses.

The area is also noted for its many waterfalls.

Geology and geography

Delaware Water Gap

The namesake feature of the recreation area is the prominent Delaware Water Gap, located at the area's southern end. The Delaware River runs through the gap, separating Pennsylvania's Mount Minsi on Blue Mountain, elevation , from New Jersey's Mount Tammany on Kittatinny Mountain, elevation .

The gap has long facilitated transportation across the ridge, with Pennsylvania building the first road through the gap in 1793. Today, I-80 occupies the eastern side of the gap, while PA 611 and the Pocono Mainline of the Delaware-Lackawanna Railroad runs through the western side.

Minisink

The Delaware Water Gap National Recreation Area incorporates much of the historical Minisink. The Minisink (or more recently "Minisink Valley") is a loosely defined geographic region of the Upper Delaware River valley in northwestern New Jersey (Sussex and Warren counties), northeastern Pennsylvania (Pike and Monroe counties) and New York (Orange and Sullivan counties). The name was derived by Dutch colonists from the Munsee name for the area. While the term "Minisink" is not used often today, it is preserved because of its historical significance in the early European settlement of the region during the American colonial period and as an artifact of the early "first contact" between Native Americans and early European explorers, traders and missionaries in the seventeenth century.

History

At the time of European contact, the Minisink was inhabited by Munsee, the northern branch of the Lenape. The area's first European settlers arrived in the late seventeenth and early eighteenth centuries and were Dutch and French Huguenot families from colonial New York's Hudson River Valley.

Tocks Island Dam project

The Delaware River is prone to floods—some resulting from seasonal snow melt or rain run-off from heavy rainstorms.  However, record flooding occurred in August 1955 in the aftermath of two separate hurricanes (Hurricane Connie and Hurricane Diane) that passed over the area within the span of one week. On 19 August 1955, the river gauge at Riegelsville, Pennsylvania recorded that the Delaware River reached a crest of 38.85 feet, or 16.85 feet above flood stage.

A project to dam the river near Tocks Island was in the works before the 1955 floods.  But several deaths and severe damages resulting from these floods brought the issue of flood control to the national level.  The U.S. Army Corps of Engineers proposed the construction of the dam, which would have created a 37-mile (60-km) long lake between Pennsylvania and New Jersey, with depths of up to 140 feet. The area around the lake would be established as the Tocks Island National Recreation Area under the oversight of the National Park Service, to offer recreation activities such as hunting, hiking, fishing, and boating. In addition to flood control and recreation, the dam would be used to generate hydroelectric power and provide a clean water supply to New York City and Philadelphia.

Starting in 1960, the present-day area of the Recreation Area was acquired for the Army Corps of Engineers through eminent domain. Approximately 15,000 people were displaced by the condemnation of personal property along the Delaware River and the surrounding area. An estimated 3,000 to 5,000 dwellings and outbuildings were demolished in preparation for the dam project and subsequent flooding of the valley. This included many irreplaceable historical sites and structures connected with the valley's Native American and colonial heritage.

Establishment of the recreation area

In support of the Tocks Island Dam project, Congress authorized the Delaware Water Gap National Recreation Area in 1965. The area was intended to encompass a narrow strip of shoreline surrounding the reservoir, in part to make the project more cost-effective.

The dam project was embroiled in controversy, engendering strong opposition from environmental groups and embittered, displaced residents. Due to this opposition, the unavailability of funding for the dam, and a geological assessment revealing the dam would be located near active fault lines, the federal government ultimately decided to abandon the project in 1978. The lands acquired were then transferred to the National Park Service and added to the Delaware Water Gap National Recreation Area.

Recent history
The recreation area is currently facing major under-funding. Deferred maintenance costs total over $161 million, with an annual $6 million routine maintenance cost.

In November 2021, a proposal was introduced to redesignate the recreational area as a full-fledged national park, which would make it the first such park in Pennsylvania or New Jersey. Local Sierra Club chapters have supported this proposal, claiming it would help to improve the Recreation Area's infrastructure and capacity for tourists.

Superintendents and regional affiliations
Previous and current superintendents of the Delaware Water Gap National Recreation Area include:
 Peter DeGelleke, 1965–1973
 James McLaughlin, 1973–1979
 Albert "Amos" Hawkins, 1979–1988
 Richard Ring, 1988–1992
 Roger Rector, 1992–1997
 William Laitner, 1997–2003
 John Donahue, 2003–2017
 Sula Jacobs, 2018–present

The park is currently a part of Interior Region 1 of the National Park Service. It was originally a part of the Northeast region, and later the North Atlantic-Appalachian Region.

Gallery

Notable sites within the Park

Brau Kettle
Brodhead Farm
Callahan House
Cold Spring Farm Springhouse
Dingman's Ferry Dutch Reformed Church
Metz Ice Plant
John Michael Farm
Military Trail
Nyce Farm
Schoonover Mountain House
Capt. Jacob Shoemaker House
John Turn Farm
Marie Zimmermann Farm
Van Campen's Inn
Raymondskill Falls
Zion Lutheran Church
List of waterfalls of the Delaware Water Gap

References

External links

National Park Service: Delaware Water Gap National Recreation Area
The Friends Of The Delaware Water Gap National Recreation Area

 
National Park Service National Recreation Areas
National Park Service Wild and Scenic Rivers
Wild and Scenic Rivers of the United States
Pocono Mountains
Delaware Water Gap
National Park Service areas in New Jersey
National Park Service areas in Pennsylvania
Protected areas of Sussex County, New Jersey
Protected areas of Warren County, New Jersey
Protected areas of Northampton County, Pennsylvania
Protected areas of Monroe County, Pennsylvania
Protected areas of Pike County, Pennsylvania
Protected areas established in 1965
1965 establishments in New Jersey
1965 establishments in Pennsylvania